Bolshiye Mordovskiye Poshaty is a rural locality (a hamlet), administrative centre of Bolshemordovsko-poshatskoye rural Locality of Yelnikovsky District, Mordovia, Russia.

Etymology
Pre-Christian Moksha name Pashat and velä "village" is for ''Pashat's village'".

History
Mentioned in 1614 among 9 villages of Steldema belyak together with "Anayeva, Shapkina, Podlyasova, Selische, Paramzina, Zheravkina, Kargashina, 1/2 Avdalova".

Geography 
Bolshiye Mordovskiye Poshaty is located in 20 km of Yelniki (the district's administrative centre) by road and 85 km of Lashma station.

Sources

References 

Rural localities in Mordovia
Yelnikovsky District